Egbert Swensson (born 24 May 1956) is a German sailor who competed in the 1980 Summer Olympics.

References

1956 births
Living people
German male sailors (sport)
Olympic sailors of East Germany
Sailors at the 1980 Summer Olympics – 470
Olympic silver medalists for East Germany
Olympic medalists in sailing
Medalists at the 1980 Summer Olympics